Barton Gerald Kirkconnell (6 May 1917 – 31 August 2007) was a Jamaican sailor. He competed at the 1964 Summer Olympics and the 1968 Summer Olympics.

References

External links
 
 

1917 births
2007 deaths
Jamaican male sailors (sport)
Olympic sailors of Jamaica
Sailors at the 1964 Summer Olympics – Dragon
Sailors at the 1968 Summer Olympics – Dragon
People from Cayman Brac